The 2019 Grand Est Open 88 was a professional tennis tournament played on outdoor clay courts. It was the thirteenth edition of the tournament which was part of the 2019 ITF Women's World Tennis Tour. It took place in Contrexéville, France between 8 and 14 July 2019.

Singles main-draw entrants

Seeds

 1 Rankings are as of 1 July 2019.

Other entrants
The following players received wildcards into the singles main draw:
  Tessah Andrianjafitrimo
  Timea Bacsinszky
  Alice Ramé
  Margot Yerolymos

The following players received entry from the qualifying draw:
  Nigina Abduraimova
  Sara Cakarevic
  Jana Fett
  María Herazo González
  Vivien Juhászová
  Sofia Shapatava

The following player received entry as a lucky loser:
  Caroline Werner

Champions

Singles

 Katarina Zavatska def.  Ulrikke Eikeri, 6–4, 6–4

Doubles

 Georgina García Pérez /  Oksana Kalashnikova def.  Anna Danilina /  Eva Wacanno, 6–3, 6–3

References

External links
 2019 Grand Est Open 88 at ITFtennis.com
 Official website

2019 ITF Women's World Tennis Tour
2019 in French tennis
Grand Est Open 88